Beutelius is a small genus of ommatid beetles native to Australia. It is only one of three extant genera in the family, alongside Tetraphalerus and Omma. It currently contains four species, three of which were originally assigned to Omma, and it is distinguished from Omma by the presence of flattened, ribbed scales covering most areas, as well as longer maxillary and labial palps, and an anteriorly depressed gulamentum.

Species
Beutelius mastersi (MacLeay, 1871) inland New South Wales and Queensland
Beutelius reidi Escalona et al, 2020 northwest New South Wales
Beutelius rutherfordi (Lawrence, 1999) Mallee Woodlands and Shrublands
Beutelius sagitta (Neboiss, 1989) Mallee Woodlands and Shrublands

References

Ommatidae
Endemic fauna of Australia
Insects of Australia